Jimit Trivedi is an Indian actor, who has performed in Hindi and Gujarati cinema, television and theatre.

Career
Jimit Trivedi debuted in Bollywood films in 2007 with Bhool Bhulaiya, starring Akshay Kumar. His debut in Gujarati films was in 2015 with a lead role in the commercially successful film Gujjubhai The Great, alongside Siddharth Randeria. He is also the leading character in the movie's sequel, GujjuBhai - Most Wanted.
Jimit was also the lead role in the Gujarati film Polam Pol. He played a supporting role in the 2018 Bollywood film 102 Not Out starring  Amitabh Bachchan and the late Rishi Kapoor.

Trivedi is also into Hindi television shows. He was a part of various daily soaps. In Ek Doosre Se Karte Hain Pyaar Hum he played a small but significant role.

Filmography

Television

Theatre/drama

Ad films

References

Male actors in Gujarati-language films
Male actors in Hindi cinema
Gujarati theatre
Year of birth missing (living people)
Gujarati people
Male actors from Mumbai
Living people